A Mediterranean climate, also called a dry summer climate, described by Köppen as Cs, is a climate type that occurs in the lower mid-latitudes (normally 30 to 44 north and south latitude), characterized by warm to hot, dry summers and mild, fairly wet winters; these weather conditions are typically experienced in the majority of Mediterranean-climate regions and countries, but remain highly dependent on proximity to the ocean, altitude and geographical location. 

The dry summer climate is found throughout the warmer middle latitudes, affecting almost exclusively the western portions of continents in relative proximity to the coast. The climate type's name is in reference to the coastal regions of the Mediterranean Sea, which mostly share this type of climate, but it can also be found in the Atlantic portions of Iberia and Northwest Africa, the Pacific portions of the United States and Chile, areas around Cape Town, South Africa, parts of Southwest and South Australia and parts of Central Asia.

Mediterranean climate zones are typically located along the western coasts of landmasses, between roughly 30 and 45 degrees north or south of the equator. The main cause of Mediterranean, or dry summer, climate is the subtropical ridge, extending towards the hemisphere in question’s pole during the summer and migrating towards the equator during the winter. This is due to the seasonal poleward-equatorward variations of temperatures.

The resulting vegetation of Mediterranean climates are the garrigue or maquis in the European Mediterranean Basin, the chaparral in California, the fynbos in South Africa, the mallee in Australia, and the matorral in Chile. Areas with this climate are also where the so-called "Mediterranean trinity" of major agricultural crops have traditionally been successfully grown (wheat, grapes and olives). As a result, these regions are notable for their high-quality wines, grapeseed/olive oils, and bread products.

Most of the historically-iconic cities and regions of the Mediterranean Basin lie within the Mediterranean climatic zone, including Algiers, Athens, Barcelona, Beirut, İzmir, Jerusalem, Marseille, Monaco, Naples, Rome, Tunis, Valencia, and Valletta. Locations with Mediterranean climates outside of the Mediterranean Basin include Adelaide, Cape Town, Casablanca, Dushanbe, Lisbon, Los Angeles, Perth, Porto, San Diego, San Francisco, Santiago, Tashkent and Victoria.

Köppen climate classification

Under the Köppen climate classification, "hot dry-summer" climates (classified as Csa) and "cool dry-summer" climates (classified as Csb) are often referred to as just "Mediterranean". Under the Köppen climate system, the first letter indicates the climate group (in this case temperate climates). Temperate climates or "C" zones average temperature above  (or ), but below , in their coolest months. The second letter indicates the precipitation pattern ("s" represents dry summers). Some, however, use a  level. The third letter indicates the degree of summer heat: "a" represents an average temperature in the warmest month above , while "b" indicates the average temperature in the warmest month below . There is a "c" with 3 or less months' average temperature above , but this climate is rare and is very isolated.

Under the Köppen classification, dry-summer climates (Csa, Csb) usually occur on the western sides of continents. Csb zones in the Köppen system include areas normally not associated with Mediterranean climates but with Oceanic climates, such as much of the Pacific Northwest, much of southern Chile, parts of west-central Argentina, and parts of New Zealand. Additional highland areas in the subtropics also meet Cs requirements, though they, too, are not normally associated with Mediterranean climates. The same goes for a number of oceanic islands such as Madeira, the Juan Fernández Islands, the western part of the Canary Islands, and the eastern part of the Azores.

Under Trewartha's modified Köppen climate classification, the two major requirements for a Cs climate are revised. In the Trewartha climate classification system, the cooler summer Csb zones in the Köppen system become Do or temperate oceanic climate.

Under the Holdridge life zones classification, the Mediterranean climates can be either temperate or subtropical climates. Biotemperature is based on the growing season length and temperature. It is measured as the mean of all temperatures, with all temperatures below freezing and above  adjusted to 0 °C, as plants are normally dormant at these temperatures. The frost line separates the warm temperate region from the subtropical region. It represents the dividing line between two major physiological groups of evolved plants. On the warmer side of the line, the majority of the plants are sensitive in low temperatures. They can be killed back by frosts as they have not evolved to withstand periods of cold. On the colder temperate side of the line, the total flora is adapted to survive periods of variable lengths of low temperatures, whether as seeds in the case of the annuals or as perennial plants which can withstand the cold.

Precipitation

During summer, regions of the Mediterranean climate are strongly influenced by the subtropical ridge which keeps atmospheric conditions very dry with minimal cloud coverage. In some areas, such as coastal California, the cold current has a stabilizing effect on the surrounding air, further reducing the chances for rain, but often causing thick layers of marine fog that usually evaporates by mid-day. Similar to desert climates, in many Mediterranean climates there is a strong diurnal character to daily temperatures in the warm summer months due to strong solar heating during the day from sunlight and rapid cooling at night.

In winter, the subtropical ridge migrates towards the equator and leaves the area, making rainfall much more likely. As a result, areas with this climate receive almost all of their precipitation during their winter and spring seasons, and may go anywhere from four to six months during the summer and early fall without having any significant precipitation. In the lower latitudes, precipitation usually decreases in both the winter and summer due to higher evapotranspiration. Toward the polar latitudes, total moisture usually increases; for instance, the Mediterranean climate in Southern Europe has more rain. The rainfall also tends to be more evenly distributed throughout the year in Southern Europe, while in places such as the Eastern Mediterranean, or in Southern California, the summer is nearly or completely dry. In places where evapotranspiration is higher, steppe climates tend to prevail, but still follow the basic pattern of the Mediterranean climates.

Temperature 

The majority of the regions with Mediterranean climates have relatively mild winters and very warm summers. However, winter and summer temperatures can vary greatly between different regions with a Mediterranean climate. For instance, in the case of winters, Los Angeles experiences mild to warm temperatures in the winter, with frost and snowfall almost unknown, whereas Tashkent has cold winters with annual frosts and snowfall seen in the winter; or, to consider summer, Seville experiences rather high temperatures in that season. In contrast, San Francisco has cool summers with daily highs around  due to the continuous upwelling of cold subsurface waters along the coast.

Because most regions with a Mediterranean climate are near large bodies of water, temperatures are generally moderate, with a comparatively small range of temperatures between the winter low and summer high unlike dry-summer humid continental climates (although the daily diurnal range of temperature during the summer is large due to dry and clear conditions, except along the immediate coastlines). Temperatures during winter only occasionally fall below the freezing point and snow is generally seldom seen. Summer temperatures can be cool to very hot, depending on the distance from a large body of water, elevation, and latitude, among other factors. Strong winds from inland desert regions can sometimes boost summer temperatures up, quickly increasing the risk of wildfires. Notable exceptions to the usual proximity from bodies of water, thus featuring extremely high summer temperatures and cooler winters, include south-eastern Turkey and northern Iraq (Urfa, Erbil), surrounded by hot deserts to the south and mountains to the north.

As in every climatologic domain, the highland locations of the Mediterranean domain can present cooler temperatures in the summer and winter than the lowland areas, temperatures which can sometimes prohibit the growth of typical cold-sensitive Mediterranean plants. Some Spanish authors opt in to use the term Continental Mediterranean Climate for some regions with lower temperatures in winter than the coastal areas (direct translation from ), but most climate classifications (including Köppen's Cs zones) show no distinction as long as winter temperature means stay above freezing.

Additionally, the temperature and rainfall pattern for a Csa or even a Csb climate can exist as a microclimate in some high-altitude locations adjacent to a rare tropical As (tropical savanna climate with dry summers, typically in a rainshadow region, as in Hawaii).
These have a favourable climate, with mild wet winters and fairly warm, dry summers.

Mediterranean biome

The Mediterranean forests, woodlands, and scrub biome is closely associated with Mediterranean climate zones, as are unique freshwater communities, though vegetation native to the Mediterranean climate zone can also be found in the approximate nearby climate zones, which usually tend to be the humid subtropical, oceanic and/or semi-arid zones, depending on the region and location. Particularly distinctive of the climate are sclerophyll shrublands, called maquis in the Mediterranean Basin, chaparral in California, matorral in Chile, fynbos in South Africa, and mallee and kwongan shrublands in Australia.

Aquatic communities in Mediterranean climate regions are adapted to a yearly cycle in which abiotic (environmental) controls of stream populations and community structure dominate during floods, biotic components (e.g. competition and predation) controls become increasingly important as the flood discharge declines, and environmental controls regain dominance as environmental conditions become very harsh (i.e. hot and dry); as a result, these communities are well suited to recover from droughts, floods, and fires. Aquatic organisms in these regions show distinct long-term patterns in their structure and function, and are also highly sensitive to the recent effects of climate change.

Natural vegetation
The native vegetation of Mediterranean climate lands must be adapted to survive long, hot summer droughts in summer and prolonged wet periods in winter. Mediterranean vegetation examples include the following:
Evergreen trees: bay laurel, eucalyptus, grevillea, casuarina, melaleuca, pine, and cypress
Deciduous trees: sycamore, oak, and buckeyes
Fruit trees: olive, figs, walnuts and grapes
Shrubs: rosemary, Erica, Banksia, and chamise
Sub-shrubs: lavender, Halimium, and sagebrush
Grasses: grassland types, Themeda triandra, bunchgrasses; sedges, and rushes
Herbs: Achillea, Dietes, Helichrysum and Penstemon

Many native vegetations in Mediterranean climate area valleys have been cleared for agriculture and farming. In places such as the Sacramento Valley and Oxnard Plain in California, draining marshes and estuaries combined with supplemental irrigation has led to a century of intensive agriculture. Much of the Overberg in the southern Cape of South Africa, was once covered with renosterveld, but has likewise been largely converted to agriculture, mainly for wheat. In hillside and mountainous areas, away from the urban sprawls, ecosystems and habitats of native vegetation are more sustained and undisturbed.

The fynbos vegetation in the South-western Cape in South Africa is famed for its high floral diversity, and includes such plant types as members of the Restionaceae, Ericas (Heaths) and Proteas. Representatives of the Proteaceae also grow in Australia, such as Banksias. The palette of California native plants is also renowned for its species and cultivar diversity.

Hot-summer Mediterranean climate

This subtype of the Mediterranean climate (Csa) is the most common form of the Mediterranean climate, therefore it is also known as a "typical Mediterranean climate". Also, at least four months must average above  to avoid becoming a cold mediterranean subtype. Regions with this form of the Mediterranean climate typically experience hot, sometimes very hot and dry summers and mild, wet winters. In a number of instances, summers here can closely resemble summers seen in arid and semi-arid climates and be close to the thresholds for them. However, high temperatures during summers are generally not quite as high as those in arid or semiarid climates due to the presence of a large body of water nearby. All areas with this subtype have wet mild winters. However, some areas with a hot Mediterranean subtype can actually experience very chilly winters, with occasional snowfall.

Csa climates are mainly found around the Mediterranean Sea, southern Australia, southwestern South Africa, sections of Central Asia, northern sections of Iran and Iraq, the interior of northern California west of the Sierra Nevada, along the Wasatch Front in Utah, and inland areas of southern Oregon west of the Cascade Mountains. Southern California's coasts also experience hot summers due to the shielding effect of the Channel Islands. However, unshielded areas of that coastline can have warm-summer Mediterranean climates with hot-summer areas just a few kilometres inland.

Warm-summer Mediterranean climate

Also, at least four months must average above  once again.

Cool ocean currents, upwelling and higher latitudes are often the reason for this cooler type of Mediterranean climate. This is why it rarely occurs on the Mediterranean Sea shores, as it is a warm sea and is subtropical, from 3 to 6 °C above the theoric value according to Jean Demangeot.

The other main reason for this cooler type is the altitude.

Winters are rainy and can be mild to chilly. In some instances, snow can fall on these areas.

Precipitation occurs often in the colder seasons, but there are a number of clear sunny days even during the wetter seasons.

Csb climates are found in northwestern Iberian Peninsula (namely Galicia and the Norte region and west coast of Portugal), in coastal California, in the Pacific Northwest (namely western Washington, western Oregon and southern portions of Vancouver Island in British Columbia), in central Chile, in parts of southern Australia and in sections of southwestern South Africa. A few locations close to the south coast of England such as Weymouth and Portland just scrape into this climate classification due to very low rainfall in July. A trend towards slightly drier summers during the 1971-2000 climate average period, meant that this classification previously extended slightly further to include a few other weather stations in southern England, such as Bognor Regis and Teignmouth. Rarer instances of this climate can be found in relatively small and isolated high altitude areas of the Andes in Northern Ecuador, Colombia, and Western Venezuela.

Cold-summer Mediterranean climate

The cold-summer subtype of the Mediterranean climate (Csc) is rare and predominately found at scattered high-altitude locations along the west coasts of North and South America having a similar climate. This type is characterized by cool, dry summers, with less than four months with a mean temperature at or above , as well as with cool, wet winters, with no winter month having a mean temperature below  (or ), depending on the isotherm used). Regions with this climate are influenced by the dry-summer trend (though briefly)  that extends considerably poleward along the west coast of the Americas, as well as the moderating influences of high altitude and relative proximity to the Pacific Ocean, thus maintaining a narrow temperature range through the year.

In North America, areas with Csc climate can be found in the Olympic, Cascade, Klamath, and Sierra Nevada ranges in Washington, Oregon and California. These locations are found at high altitude nearby lower altitude regions characterized by a warm-summer Mediterranean climate (Csb) or hot-summer Mediterranean climate (Csa). A rare instance of this climate occurs in the tropics, on Haleakalā Summit in Hawaii.

In South America, Csc regions can be found along the Andes in Chile and Argentina. The town of Balmaceda, Chile is one of the few towns confirmed to have this climate.

Small areas with a Csc climate can be found at high elevations in Corsica.

In Norway, the small fishing village of Røst above the Arctic Circle has a climate bordering on Csc and is known as a "climatic anomaly" due to abnormally warm temperatures despite its latitude located above 67°N latitude.

References

External links

 Explanation of Mediterranean Climate (University of Wisconsin)

Climate
Köppen climate types